Most of the series broadcast by the cable television channel Disney Junior (Latin America) are Disney Junior Series  as Mickey Mouse Clubhouse, Handy Manny, Jake and the Never Land Pirates, and Sofia the First. Until 2011, the series were hosted by two monkey puppets, known as Ooh and Aah.

Current programming
PJ Masks (September 26, 2016 – present)
Molang (2016–present)
Marvel Super Hero Adventures (2017–present)
Puppy Dog Pals (August 5, 2017  – present)
Vampirina (December 2, 2017 – present)
Muppet Babies (June 10, 2018 – present)
Fancy Nancy (October 14, 2018 - present)
T.O.T.S. (October 14, 2019 – present)
Guitar & Drum (Guitarra y Tambor) (2020–present)
Canciones para Soñar (2020–present)
Bluey (April 20, 2020 – present)
Mira, Royal Detective (July 20, 2020 – present)
Dino Ranch (September 20, 2021 – present)
The Chicken Squad (October 18, 2021 – present)
Spidey and His Amazing Friends (January 10, 2022 – present)
Mickey Mouse Funhouse (February 14, 2022 – present)
Doggyworld (Mundo Perro) (2022–present)
El Ristorantino de Arnoldo (December 12, 2022 – present)

Reruns
Junior Express (November 30, 2013 – present)
The Lion Guard (May 9, 2016 – present)
 Art Attack (2011–present)
Mickey Mouse Clubhouse (2011–present)
Doc McStuffins (June 4, 2012 – present)
Mickey Mouse: Mixed-Up Adventures (May 8, 2017 – present)
101 Dalmatian Street (November 2, 2020 – present)
The Rocketeer (April 5, 2020 - present)
Nivis, amigos de otro mundo (July 20, 2019 – present)
Elena of Avalor (November 6, 2016 - present)
 Gigantosaurus (2019 - present)

Blocks

Regular programming

This is where all the series are aired, both original and non-original. It is aired all the time when Mini Cine is not being aired.

Animated shorts
Art Attack

Former programming

The 7D
101 Dalmatians: The Series
64 Zoo Lane
8 Gemini
Aladdin: The Series
Avengers Assemble
Bear in the Big Blue House
Bo on the Go!
Bubba y sus amigos
Bubu and the Little Owls
Bunnytown
Canimals
Care Bears: Adventures in Care-a-Lot
Care Bears: Welcome to Care-a-Lot
Chloe's Closet
Chuggington
Daniel Tiger's Neighborhood
Dino Aventuras
The Doodlebops
Ella the Elephant
The Flower Shop of Barbara/Nana
The Garden of Clarilu
Goldie and Bear
Guess with Jess
Handy Manny 
Henry Hugglemonster 
The Hive
Higglytown Heroes
Imagination Movers
Jake and the Never Land Pirates 
Joe and Jack
JoJo's Circus
Jungle Junction
La casa de Disney Junior
Lilo & Stitch: The Series
Little Einsteins
The Little Mermaid: The Series
Maya the Bee
The Mighty Jungle
Miles from Tomorrowland
Morko y Mali 
My Friends Tigger & Pooh
O Diário de Mika
Oswald
Olivia
Pajanimals
Paprika
PB&J Otter
P. King Duckling
Plim Plim
Playground
Poppets Town
Poppy Cat
Rolie Polie Olie
Sheriff Callie's Wild West 
Simon
Sofia the First 
Spider-Man
Stanley
Special Agent Oso
Strawberry Shortcake's Berry Bitty Adventures
Tip the Mouse
The Wiggles
Ultimate Spider-Man
Yo Gabba Gabba!
Zou

References

Disney Junior
Disney Channels Worldwide original programming
Disney Channel related-lists